Marion County Lake is a body of water,  southeast of Marion at 170th Street, on the western edge of the Flint Hills region of Kansas in the United States. This small lake is not the larger Marion Reservoir, which is northwest of Marion.

Geography
Marion County Lake is located at coordinates 38.3206708, -96.9852588 in the scenic Flint Hills and Great Plains of the state of Kansas.  The lake area has three entrances.  The north entry is 1 mile east of Marion on K-256 / 190th Street / Main Street, then 1.75 miles south on Upland Road.  The east entry is 3/4 mile west of U.S. Route 77 on 170th Street.  The west entry is rural un-paved county roads of 170th Street or Turkey Creek Road.

History

Early history
For many millennia, the Great Plains of North America was inhabited by nomadic Native Americans.  From the 16th century to 18th century, the Kingdom of France claimed ownership of large parts of North America.  In 1762, after the French and Indian War, France secretly ceded New France to Spain, per the Treaty of Fontainebleau.

19th century
In 1802, Spain returned most of the land to France.  In 1803, most of the land for modern day Kansas was acquired by the United States from France as part of the 828,000 square mile Louisiana Purchase for 2.83 cents per acre.

In 1854, the Kansas Territory was organized, then in 1861 Kansas became the 34th U.S. state.  In 1855, Marion County was established within the Kansas Territory, which included the land for modern day Lake.

20th century
In 1937, Marion County Lake was completed by the Civilian Conservation Corps for the purpose of recreation.

21st century
In 2002, it was listed on the National Register of Historic Places (NRHP).

In 2012, an event at the park set the Guinness World Record for the "most people roasting marshmallows at once", at 1,272 people.

Education
The community is served by Marion–Florence USD 408 public school district.

See also
 List of lakes, reservoirs, and dams in Kansas
 List of rivers of Kansas

References

Further reading

External links
 
 Marion County Lake, KansasFlintHills.travel
 
 
 Marion County cemetery list, archive of KsGenWeb
 Marion County history bibliography,  Marion County school bibliography, Kansas Historical Society
 Marion County maps: Current, Historic, KDOT
 Topo Map of Marion to Florence area, USGS

County parks in the United States
Lakes of Kansas
Protected areas of Marion County, Kansas